The 1986 World University Cycling Championship is the 2nd Word University Cycling Championship sponsored by the International University Sports Federation (FISU) and sanctioned by the Union Cycliste Internationale (UCI). The championship was hosted by the Russian city, Moscow. Cycling athletes from universities all over the world competed in their disciplines to become World University Cycling Champion.

References

External links
International University Sports Federation - Cycling

World University Cycling Championships
World Championships
World Championships
Sports competitions in Moscow
1986 in Moscow
International sports competitions hosted by the Soviet Union
1986 in cycle racing
Cycle races in the Soviet Union